Diana Duarte Gomes (born July 6, 1989) is a Portuguese swimmer, who specialized in breaststroke events. She is a two-time Olympian and a multiple-time Portuguese record holder for the long and short course breaststroke events (50, 100, and 200 m). She also won three medals (two golds and one bronze) in the same category at the 2005 European Junior Swimming Championships in Budapest, Hungary.

Gomes made her first Olympic team, as Portugal's youngest swimmer (aged 15), at the 2004 Summer Olympics in Athens, Greece. In the 100 m breaststroke, Gomes finished in last place on the fourth heat by four tenths of a second (0.40) behind Croatia's Smiljana Marinović in 1:11.40. In the 200 m breaststroke, Gomes placed twenty-third in the morning prelims with a seasonal best of 2:34.23, nearly two seconds farther from the Portuguese record (2:31.32).

At the 2008 Summer Olympics in Beijing, Gomes qualified for the second time in two swimming events, by clearing FINA B-standard entry times of 1:09.96 (100 m breaststroke) from the European Championships in Eindhoven, Netherlands, and 2:30.35 (200 m breaststroke) from the EDF Swimming Open in Paris, France. In her first event, 100 m breaststroke, Gomes challenged seven other swimmers on the fourth heat, including South Korea's Jung Seul-Ki, and two-time Olympian Inna Kapishina of Belarus. She edged out Kapishina to a third-place sprint by 0.15 of a second, lowering her Olympic time to 1:10.02. In the 200 m breaststroke, Gomes lowered her personal best to 2:30.18, but failed to advance into the semifinals for the second time, as she placed twenty-ninth overall in the preliminaries.

References

External links
NBC Olympics Profile

1989 births
Living people
Olympic swimmers of Portugal
Swimmers at the 2004 Summer Olympics
Swimmers at the 2008 Summer Olympics
Portuguese female breaststroke swimmers
Swimmers from Lisbon